Orphanostigma fulvistriga is a moth in the family Crambidae. It was described by Charles Swinhoe in 1894. It is found in Meghalaya, India.

References

Moths described in 1894
Spilomelinae